This is a list of episodes from the seventh season of Columbo.

Broadcast history
Although NBC had brought an end to the Mystery Movie series that Columbo had been a part of since 1971, the network decided to keep the series in production and ordered five new telefilms. The first two aired on Monday nights, the first on November 21, 1977, and the second on January 30, 1978. After that, the remaining three films were broadcast on Saturday nights beginning on February 25, 1978, and concluding with the final film of the original Columbo series on May 13, 1978.

DVD release
The season was released on DVD by Universal Home Video along with season six.

Episodes

Columbo 07
1977 American television seasons
1978 American television seasons